Party Pilipinas is a Philippine television variety show broadcast by GMA Network. Hosted by Regine Velasquez, Ogie Alcasid, Jaya and Janno Gibbs, it premiered on March 28, 2010, replacing SOP. The show concluded on May 19, 2013, with a total of 160 episodes. It was replaced by Sunday All Stars in its timeslot.

History
Party Pilipinas was conceptualized as an "all-party and all-positive vibes" show, according to the Corporate Communications Department of GMA Network and the show's new production manager, Ruth Mariñas.

The hosts of SOP, Regine Velasquez, Ogie Alcasid, Janno Gibbs, and Jaya joined the show, along with Kyla, Jay-R, and La Diva. In addition, Rachelle Ann Go and Mark Bautista also joined the show.

Louie Ignacio left the show after the episode on April 25, 2010, due to unknown reasons. Headwriter Rommel Gacho became the show's temporary director from May 2–23 before management named Mark A. Reyes and Rico Gutierrez as the show's permanent replacements for Ignacio.

On June 20, 2010, the program created a history in Philippine TV history as it became the first show to air in 3D.

The show also became witness to some of engagements in the Philippines' show business. Alcasid and Velasquez announced their wedding engagement during their August 8, 2010, episode. Velasquez also had her pre-nuptial message and confirmation of pregnancy in the show.

On March 27, 2011, the show celebrated its first anniversary, having a simultaneous live performances in four key cities in the Philippines: Manila (GMA Studio 7), Baguio (Melvin Jones Grandstand), Davao City (Rizal Park) and Cebu City (Fuente Osmeña Circle) with GMA's in-house directors Noel Cabacungan, Rommel Gacho, Ding Bolanos and Mark A. Reyes. The anniversary episode also included the launch of GMA's summer plug for 2011, "Halo-Halo Ang Summer Saya".

From April 17 to May 15, 2011, GB Sampedro alongside Mark A. Reyes directed the show. Sampedro replaced Gutierrez because the latter had resigned from co-directing the show. On July 24 of that same year, Treb Monteras replaced Sampedro from directing the show.

Party Pilipinas became also a home to international guests including U-KISS (March 28 and June 13, 2010), Jason Derulo (July 25, 2010), Dan Hill (February 6, 2011), Far East Movement (March 13, 2011), Chauncey Black of Blackstreet (January 29, 2012) and Jay Park (May 6, 2012).

In 2011, the show received its first award at Catholic Mass Media Awards as Best Entertainment Program, and September 2011, former Pinoy Dream Academy finalist Irish Fullerton performed for the first time on the show as part of her debut on GMA Network.

On February 8, 2013, the Movie and Television Review and Classification Board meted a six-month probation period on the show for a dance number that was deemed "sexually charged" by the Board. The network was ordered to make a public apology.

On March 24, 2013, former ASAP co-host and performer Christian Bautista performed for the first time on the show as part of his debut on GMA Network. He reunited with his co-former ASAP co-hosts and performers Rachelle Ann Go, also his former girlfriend, and Mark Bautista, a good friend of his, with former Pilipinas Got Talent finalist singer Sherwin Baguion, and former Pinoy Big Brother: Teen Clash 2010 finalist Fretzie Bercede while additional to the group.

Party Pilipinas was set in different destinations during Summer 2013 as a celebration of the 3rd anniversary of the show. The show was held at Ynares Center, Antipolo City; Philippine Navy Headquarters, Manila; Le Pavillon, Metropolitan Park, Roxas Boulevard; and Mall of Asia Arena, Pasay.
That is because the show's 100,000-sq-m studio in the GMA compound in Quezon City was converted into a state-of-the art hub for the network's 28 hours coverage of the automated elections called Eleksyon 2013 from May 13–14, 2013.

The show had its final episode on May 19, 2013, after the management decided to cancel the show and replace it with Sunday All Stars.

Cast

 Regine Velasquez 
 Ogie Alcasid 
 Jaya 
 Janno Gibbs

Co-hosts and performers

 Aicelle Santos 
 Aira Bermudez
 Alden Richards 
 Aljur Abrenica 
 Alvin De Castro
 Andi Manzano 
 Arkin Magalona
 Artstrong
 Barbie Forteza
 Bea Binene 
 Bela Padilla 
 Bernard Cardona
 Benjamin Alves
 Bianca King
 Bubbles Paraiso
 Carla Abellana 
 Chloe McCulley
 Christian Bautista 
 Dennis Trillo
 Derrick Monasterio
 Dingdong Dantes 
 Diva Montelaba
 Down to Mars
 Ehra Madrigal
 Elmo Magalona 
 Enzo Pineda
 Eugene Herrera
 Frencheska Farr 
 Gabby Eigenmann 
 Gaz Holgate
 Geoff Eigenmann
 Geoff Taylor 
 Glaiza de Castro
 Gloc 9
 Gian Magdangal
 Gino Quillamor
 Gwen Zamora
 Gwendoline Ruais
 Hanna Flores
 Heart Evangelista 
 Irish Fullerton
 Isabel Oli
 Isabelle Daza 
 Iza Calzado 
 Jak Roberto
 Jake Vargas
 Jason Castro
 Jay R
 Jay Perillo
 Jennylyn Mercado 
 Jeric Gonzales
 Jillian Ward
 Jolina Magdangal 
 Jonalyn Viray 
 Joshua Dionisio 
 Joyce Ching
 Julian Trono
 Julie Anne San Jose 
 Katrina Halili 
 KC Montero
 Ken Chan
 Kenneth Monico
 Kevin Cisco
 Kris Bernal 
 Kris Lawrence
 Kristofer Martin
 Kyla
 Kylie Padilla
 Lexi Fernandez
 Louise delos Reyes
 Lovi Poe 
 Marc Abaya
 Marian Rivera
 Maricris Garcia
 Mark Bautista 
 Mark Herras 
 Marvin Agustin
 Mayton Eugenio
 Maxene Magalona 
 Michelle Madrigal
 Michael Pangilinan
 Mike Tan
 Mikoy Morales
 Miguel Escueta
 Mona Louise Rey
 Panky Trinidad
 Rachelle Ann Go 
 Rafael Rosell
 Raymond Gutierrez
 Rhian Ramos
 Richard Gutierrez
 Rico Barrera
 Rico Robles
 Rita Daniela
 Rocco Nacino
 Rochelle Pangilinan
 Ronnie Liang
 Ruru Madrid 
 Ryza Cenon 
 Sam Pinto
 Sarah Lahbati 
 Sef Cadayona
 Sherwin Baguion
 Sexbomb Girls
 Solenn Heussaff
 Steven Silva
 Sunshine Dizon 
 Thea Tolentino
 Tim Yap
 Trina Alcantara
 Venus Raj 
 Will Devaughn
 Wynwyn Marquez
 XLR8 
 Yassi Pressman 
 Ynna Asistio
 Yssa Alvarez

Ratings
According to AGB Nielsen Philippines' Mega Manila household television ratings, the pilot episode of Party Pilipinas earned a 15.5% rating, while the final episode scored a 10.9% rating.

Accolades

References

External links
 

2010 Philippine television series debuts
2013 Philippine television series endings
Filipino-language television shows
GMA Network original programming
Philippine variety television shows